The following is a list of American football players that have played in both the Arena Football League and the National Football League.

A
 Dan Alexander
 Gerald Abraham
 Otis Amey
 Scotty Anderson

B
 Milton Barney
 Steve Bellisari
 Troy Bergeron
 Martin Bibla
 Damarius Bilbo
 Michael Bishop
 Phil Bogle
 Sherdrick Bonner
 Aaron Boone
 Jesse Boone
 Larry Brackins
 Chris Brewer
 C. J. Brewer
 Anthony Bright
 Travis Bond
 Mkristo Bruce
 Dialleo Burks
 Kelly Butler 
 Danny Burmeister

C
 Chris Canty
 Ron Carpenter
 Quincy Carter
 Shante Carver
 Darrin Chiaverini
 Mac Cody
 Lincoln Coleman
 José Cortéz
 Anthony Corvino
 Jerry Crafts
 Clarence Curry

D
 Woody Dantzler
 Rohan Davey
 Rashied Davis
 Rod Davis
 Thabiti Davis
 Kyle DeVan
 Rob De Vita
 Chris Dieker
 Chris Doering

E
 Troy Edwards
 Alonzo Ephraim
 Tory Epps
 Liam Ezekiel

F
 Cory Fleming
 Lance Frazier

G
 Oronde Gadsden
 Joe Germaine
 Tony Graziani
 Chris Greisen

H
 George Hall
 Joe Hamilton
 Remy Hamilton
 Atnaf Harris
 Josh Harris
 Kyries Hebert
 Nick Hill
 Delvin Lamar Hughley
 Bobby Hunt (born 1940)
 Rob Hunt (born 1981)
 Robert Hunt, (born 1996), offensive lineman
 Robert Hunt (born 1975), offensive lineman and coach
 Cletidus Hunt

I
 Khori Ivy

J
 Evington Bernard Jackson II
 Marlion Jackson
 Jermaine Jones (American football)
 Paul Justin
 Adam Juratovac

K
 Kevin Kaesviharn
 Kevin Kasper
 Lincoln Kennedy
 Shaun King
 Jim Kubiak

L
 Kareem Larrimore
 Jermaine Lewis
 Michael Lewis
 Jared Lorenzen

M
 Tommy Maddox
 Adrian Madise
 Joe Madsen
 Rod Manuel
 Todd Marinovich
 Seth Marler
 Rasheed Marshall
 Torrance Marshall
 Mike Maslowski
 Marc May
 Andy McCollum
 Bruce McCray
 Pete McMahon
 Adrian McPherson
 Donovan Morgan

N
 Browning Nagle
 Marcus Nash
 John Nix
 Al Noga

O
 Steve Octavien
 Wes Ours

P
 Jordan Palmer
 Billy Parker
 David Patten
 Sean Payton
 Duke Pettijohn
 Will Pettis

R
 Ryan Riddle
 Dante Ridgeway
 Greg Robinson-Randall

S
 Rich Salzer
 Steve Sanders
 David Saunders
 Darrell Shropshire
 Jeremy Sheffey
 Bobby Sippio
 Justin Skaggs
 Danny Southwick
 Alonzo Spellman
 Clint Stoerner
 Daleroy Stewart
 Derrick Strait
 Kevin Swayne

T
 Ed Ta'amu
 Robert Thomas
 Burl Toler, III
 Nick Truesdell

V
 Mike Vanderjagt

W
 John Walker
 Kurt Warner
 Darius Watts
 Craig Whelihan
 Josh Wilcox
 Boo Williams
 Gillis Wilson
 Rod Windsor
 Rodney Wright

External links
ArenaFan list

National Football League
Arena
Arena